Poondla is a village in Guntur district of the Indian state of Andhra Pradesh. It is located in Bapatla mandal of Tenali revenue division.

Geography 

The irrigation water for the village and its surrounding areas is drawn from Prakasam Barrage reservoir, through the Kommamuru and Poondla channels of Krishna Western Delta system.

Governance 

Poondla gram panchayat is the local self-government of the village. It is divided into wards and each ward is represented by a ward member.

Education 

As per the school information report for the academic year 2018–19, the village has 3 Zilla/Mandal Parishad.

See also 

List of villages in Guntur district

References 

Villages in Guntur district